Cross Keys is an unincorporated community and census-designated place (CDP) in Blair County, Pennsylvania, United States. It was first listed as a CDP prior to the 2020 census.

The CDP is in western Blair County, in the eastern part of Allegheny Township. It is bordered to the west by U.S. Route 22/Pennsylvania Route 764, to the south by the US-22/Interstate 99 interchange, and to the east by the Altoona–Hollidaysburg line of the Norfolk Southern Railway.

Cross Keys is in the valley of Beaverdam Branch, which flows southeastward to join the Frankstown Branch of the Juniata River east of Hollidaysburg.

Demographics

References 

Census-designated places in Blair County, Pennsylvania
Census-designated places in Pennsylvania